PS-24 Nawabshah-I was a constituency of the Provincial Assembly of Sindh.It was abolished after 2018 Delimitations as Nawabshah District lost 1 seat in 2017 Census.

General elections 2013

General elections 2008

See also

 Sindh

References

External links
 Election commission Pakistan's official website
 Awazoday.com check result
 Official Website of Government of Sindh

Constituencies of Sindh